Arnar Sigurðsson (born 24 November 1981) is a retired tennis player from Iceland.

Sigurðsson had a career high ATP singles ranking of 703 achieved on 7 May 2007. He also had a career high ATP doubles ranking of 518 achieved on 8 October 2007. Sigurðsson holds the record for the number of Icelandic national titles, winning 15 singles, 15 doubles and 8 mixed doubles titles in his career.

Sigurðsson represented Iceland at the Davis Cup, where he had a W/L record of 64–31. He holds the most Davis Cup victories for Iceland and was awarded with the Davis Cup Commitment Award.

Future and Challenger finals

Doubles 5 (3–2)

References

External links
 
 
 

1981 births
Living people
Male tennis players
Sportspeople from Reykjavík
Icelandic tennis players